This article lists important figures and events in Malaysian public affairs during the year 1989, together with births and deaths of notable Malaysians.

Incumbent political figures

Federal level
Yang di-Pertuan Agong: 
Sultan Iskandar (until 25 April)
Sultan Azlan Shah (from 26 April)
Raja Permaisuri Agong: 
Sultanah Zanariah (until 25 April)
Tuanku Bainun (from 26 April)
Prime Minister: Dato' Sri Dr Mahathir Mohamad
Deputy Prime Minister: Dato' Ghafar Baba
Lord President: Abdul Hamid Omar

State level
 Sultan of Johor: Tunku Ibrahim Ismail (Regent until 25 April)
 Sultan of Kedah: Sultan Abdul Halim Muadzam Shah 
 Sultan of Kelantan: Sultan Ismail Petra
 Raja of Perlis: Tuanku Syed Putra
 Sultan of Perak: Raja Nazrin Shah (Regent from 26 April)
 Sultan of Pahang: Sultan Ahmad Shah
 Sultan of Selangor: Sultan Salahuddin Abdul Aziz Shah
 Sultan of Terengganu: Sultan Mahmud Al-Muktafi Billah Shah
 Yang di-Pertuan Besar of Negeri Sembilan: Tuanku Jaafar (Deputy Yang di-Pertuan Agong)
 Yang di-Pertua Negeri (Governor) of Penang:
 Tun Dr Awang Hassan (until May)
 Tun Dr Hamdan Sheikh Tahir (from May)
 Yang di-Pertua Negeri (Governor) of Malacca: Tun Syed Ahmad Al-Haj bin Syed Mahmud Shahabuddin
 Yang di-Pertua Negeri (Governor) of Sarawak: Tun Ahmad Zaidi Adruce Mohammed Noor
 Yang di-Pertua Negeri (Governor) of Sabah: Tun Said Keruak

Events
19 January – Planetarium Sultan Iskandar in Kuching, Sarawak, the first planetarium in Malaysia was officially opened.
1 February – The Malaysian National Speed Limit was enforced.
 19 February – A Boeing 747 owned by Flying Tiger Line crashed 12 kilometres from the Subang International Airport while on approach. The pilots misinterpreted the controller's instructions to descend, causing the aircraft to fly below minimum altitude and crash into a hillside on the outskirts of Puchong. The flight crew mistook the descent altitude to be 400 feet, when the controller actually meant 2400 feet. All 4 flight crew were killed.
 8 March – Proton Saga Knight, the first Rally, Race, Research (R3) sports car was launched at Batu Tiga Circuit, Shah Alam.
 19 March – Malaysian number one singer, Sudirman Arshad won the title " Best Performer" in the 1989 Salem Asian Music Awards at Royal Albert Hall, London, United Kingdom.
 10 April – Four people were injured in a bomb blast at Dayabumi Complex, Kuala Lumpur.
 26 April – Sultan Azlan Shah of Perak was elected as the ninth Yang di-Pertuan Agong.
 15 April – Malacca Town became a historical city and also a sister city of Kuala Lumpur.
20–31 August – The Kuala Lumpur 1989, XV Southeast Asian Games.
 22 September – Around 27 students, mostly schoolgirls were killed in the Madrasah fire tragedy in Guar Chempedak, Kedah.
 18–24 October – The 11th Commonwealth Heads of Government Meeting (CHOGM) was held in Kuala Lumpur.
 2 December – The Communist insurgency in Malaysia (1968–89) ended and the Communist Party of Malaya (CPM) agreed to a ceasefire. The peace agreement was signed at Hat Yai, Thailand by the CPM, and the Malaysian and Thai governments. CPM was officially dissolved.

Births
17 January – Aiman Hakim Ridza – Singer and actor
29 January – Ong Jian Guo – Badminton player
10 February – Neelofa – Actress and television host
9 June – Faliq Auri – Rapper
18 September – Daniel Bego – Swimmer

Deaths
17 February – S. Kadarisman – Malay actor
2 April – Ibu Zain – Malay politician, nationalist and independence campaigner
23 April – S. Sudarmaji – Malay film director
12 July – Tunku Abdul Rahman Sultan Ismail – Tunku Aris Bendahara of Johor

See also
 1989 
 1988 in Malaysia | 1990 in Malaysia
 History of Malaysia

 
Years of the 20th century in Malaysia
Malaysia
Malaysia
1980s in Malaysia